Linda Smith (1949–2007) was a Canadian writer.

Biography
Born in Lethbridge, Alberta, on April 12, 1949, Linda grew up in Calgary, Alberta. She obtained a B.A. with Distinction from the University of Calgary in 1969, and then a Bachelor of Library Science degree from the University of Alberta in 1970. She worked as a children's librarian in Truro, Nova Scotia and Saskatoon, Saskatchewan, where she was also manager of the Carlyle King Branch of Saskatoon Public Library.  From 1982 to 1984 she pursued a master's degree in Children's Literature from Simmons College in Boston, and it was there that she took a writing for children course from Nancy Bond. Returning to Canada, she became children's librarian at Grande Prairie Public Library in northern Alberta, and also began writing.

Her first book Windshifter was published in 1995 . She wrote primarily for children and young adults, and her books benefited from her years of experience as a children's librarian and her love of children's literature.  She published two linked fantasy trilogies aimed at upper elementary and junior high readers, The Freyan Trilogy, and The Tales of Three Lands Trilogy, and wrote two books for younger readers: a picture book, Sir Cassie to the Rescue, and a beginning chapter book called Kelly's Cabin.  Coteau Books posthumously published two other young adult fantasies by her: The Broken Thread, in 2008, which in 2010 won the Alberta Literary Award for children's literature and The Piper of Shadonia in 2012. In addition, several of her short stories were published in magazines such as On Spec, or read on CBC Radio's Alberta Anthology program.

Bibliography
Wind Shifter (1995)
Sea Change (1999)
The Turning Time (2001)
Sir Cassie to the Rescue (2003)
The Minstrel's Daughter (2004)
Talisa's Song (2005)
Weathermage  (2006)
Kelly's Cabin (2006)
The Broken Thread (2008)
The Piper of Shadonia (2012)

See also

List of Canadian science fiction authors

References

External links
Linda Smith Author Home Page
Review of Wind Shifter
Review of Minstrel's Daughter
Review of Sir Cassie to the Rescue
Review of Broken Thread

Smith, Linda (novelist)
Smith, Linda (novelist)
Canadian children's writers
Canadian science fiction writers
Writers from Lethbridge
Women science fiction and fantasy writers
Canadian women children's writers
Canadian women novelists
20th-century Canadian novelists
21st-century Canadian novelists
21st-century Canadian women writers
20th-century Canadian women writers